Kenneth M. Charles (born July 10, 1951) is a Trinidadian retired basketball player who played guard for the Buffalo Braves (1973–1976) and Atlanta Hawks (1976–1978). He was a 6'3" (1.90 m), 180 lb (82 kg) guard.

He played collegiately for Fordham University before being selected by the Braves in the third round (38th pick overall) of the 1973 NBA draft.

In 5 seasons he played in 322 games and played 7,637 minutes (23.7 per game), had a .441 field goal percentage (1,083 for 2,458), .789 free throw percentage (581 for 736), 640 rebounds (2.0 per game), 806 assists (2.5 per game), 407 steals (1.3 per game), 128 blocked shots (.4 per game) and 2,747 points (8.5 per game).

Charles was head coach of the Brooklyn Kings of the United States Basketball League (USBL) from 2000 to 2007. He won the USBL Coach of the Year Award in 2005.

References

External links

1951 births
Living people
Atlanta Hawks players
Brooklyn Preparatory School alumni
Buffalo Braves draft picks
Buffalo Braves players
Fordham Rams men's basketball players
National Basketball Association players from Trinidad and Tobago
Shooting guards
Trinidad and Tobago expatriate basketball people in the United States
Trinidad and Tobago men's basketball players
United States Basketball League coaches